Halep may refer to:
 A variant of the name of Aleppo, a city in northern Syria
 Dimciu Halep (born 2000), Romanian football player; see 2019–20 FC Viitorul Constanța season
 Simona Halep (born 1991), Romanian tennis player